Ceroplesis aulica is a species of beetle in the family Cerambycidae. It was described by Pascoe in 1875. It is known from the Republic of Congo, the Democratic Republic of Congo, and Angola.

Varietas
 Ceroplesis aulica var. congoana Fiedler, 1938
 Ceroplesis aulica var. mechowi Quedenfeldt, 1882
 Ceroplesis aulica var. sutureconjuncta Breuning, 1970

References

aulica
Beetles described in 1875